Telephone numbers in the Netherlands are administered by the Ministry of Economic Affairs, Agriculture and Innovation of the Netherlands and may be grouped into three general categories: geographical numbers, non-geographical numbers, and numbers for public services.

Geographical telephone numbers are sequences of 9 digits (0-9) and consist of an area code of two or three digits and a subscriber number of seven or six digits, respectively. When dialled within the country, the number must be prefixed with the trunk access code 0, identifying a destination telephone line in the Dutch telephone network.

Non-geographical numbers have no fixed length, but also required the dialling of the trunk access code (0). They are used for mobile telephone networks and other designated service types, such as toll-free dialling, Internet access, voice over IP, restricted audiences, and information resources.

In addition, special service numbers exist for emergency response, directory assistance, and other services by the public authorities.

Numbering plan
The telephone numbering plan of the Netherlands is divided into geographical, non-geographical, and special public resource telephone numbers. The dial plan prescribes that within the country dialling both geographical and non-geographical numbers requires a national network access code, which is the digit 0. The following list includes this national trunk access digit when it must be dialled before the number.

066, 084 and 087 are often used by scammers, because they are easy and cheap to register and make identification very hard.

Previously, 06-0, 06-1000 and 06-4 were used for toll-free numbers, 06-8 for shared cost, 06-9 for premium rate, and other 06-numbers for mobile numbers. 0011 and later 06-11 was used for emergency services before this changed to 112. 09 was used as the international access code before this changed to 00.

Geographical telephone numbers
Since the reorganization of the telephone system in 1995, Dutch geographical numbers consist of 9 digits. The numbering plan implements a system of area codes. An area code consists of two or three digits. The larger cities and areas have two digits with a subscriber number of seven digits, permitting more local numbers. Smaller areas use three digits with a six-digit subscriber number.

Geographic numbers are allocated in blocks to telecommunications providers. However, a telephone number from a block allocated to a certain provider may no longer be serviced by the original assignee due to number portability; subscribers who switch providers can take their number with them.

When dialled within the Netherlands, the domestic trunk access code 0 must be dialled before the telephone number, extending the dialling sequence to 10 digits. If dialling from overseas, the 0 (Zero) in front of the prefix must be omitted.

Before the 1995 reorganization, area codes were restricted to towns. This was lifted and multiple towns may now share an area code. The following table lists only one town for each area code, and it includes the trunk access code (0).

010 Rotterdam 
0111  Zierikzee 
0113  Goes 
0114  Hulst 
0115  Terneuzen 
0117  Sluis 
0118  Middelburg / Vlissingen 
013   Tilburg 
015   Delft
0161  Gilze-Rijen
0162  Oosterhout 
0164  Bergen op Zoom 
0165  Roosendaal 
0166  Tholen 
0167  Steenbergen
0168  Zevenbergen 
0172  Alphen aan den Rijn
0174  Naaldwijk 
0180  Ridderkerk and Zuidplas 
0181  Spijkenisse 
0182  Gouda 
0183  Gorinchem 
0184  Sliedrecht 
0186  Oud-Beijerland 
0187  Middelharnis 
020   Amsterdam 
0222  Texel 
0223  Den Helder 
0224  Schagen 
0226  Harenkarspel  
0227  Medemblik 
0228  Enkhuizen 
0229  Hoorn 
023   Haarlem
024   Nijmegen 
0251  Beverwijk 
0252  Hillegom 
0255  IJmuiden 
026   Arnhem
0294  Weesp 
0297  Aalsmeer 
0299  Purmerend 
030   Utrecht 
0313  Dieren 
0314  Doetinchem 
0315  Terborg 
0316  Zevenaar 
0317  Wageningen 
0318  Ede / Veenendaal 
0320  Lelystad 
0321  Dronten 
033   Amersfoort 
0341  Harderwijk 
0342  Barneveld 
0343  Doorn 
0344  Tiel
0345  Culemborg 
0346  Maarssen 
0347  Vianen 
0348  Woerden 
035   Hilversum 
036   Almere 
038   Zwolle 
040   Eindhoven 
0411  Boxtel 
0412  Oss 
0413  Veghel 
0416  Waalwijk 
0418  Zaltbommel 
043   Maastricht 
045   Heerlen 
046   Sittard 
0475  Roermond 
0478  Venray 
0481  Bemmel 
0485  Cuijk 
0486  Grave 
0487  Druten 
0488  Zetten 
0492  Helmond
0493  Deurne 
0495  Weert 
0497  Eersel 
0499  Best 
050   Groningen
0511  Veenwouden 
0512  Drachten 
0513  Heerenveen 
0514  Balk 
0515  Sneek 
0516  Oosterwolde 
0517  Franeker 
0518  St. Annaparochie  
0519  Dokkum 
0521  Steenwijk 
0522  Meppel 
0523  Hardenberg
0524  Coevorden 
0525  Elburg 
0527  Emmeloord 
0528  Hoogeveen 
0529  Ommen 
053   Enschede 
0541  Oldenzaal 
0543  Winterswijk 
0544  Groenlo 
0545  Neede 
0546  Almelo 
0547  Goor 
0548  Rijssen 
055   Apeldoorn 
0561  Wolvega 
0562  Terschelling/Vlieland 
0566  Irnsum 
0570  Deventer
0571  Voorst 
0572  Raalte 
0573  Lochem 
0575  Zutphen 
0577  Uddel 
0578  Epe 
058   Leeuwarden 
0591  Emmen 
0592  Assen 
0593  Beilen 
0594  Zuidhorn 
0595  Warffum 
0596  Appingedam 
0597  Winschoten 
0598  Hoogezand-Sappemeer 
0599  Stadskanaal 
070   The Hague 
071   Leiden 
072   Alkmaar 
073   's-Hertogenbosch  
074   Hengelo 
075   Zaandam 
076   Breda 
077   Venlo 
078   Dordrecht
079   Zoetermeer

Non-geographical telephone numbers
The non-geographic numbers do not have a prescribed fixed number of digits, but are usually kept as short as possible. Mobile telephone numbers, however, always have 9 digits, just like geographic numbers.

The non-geographical telephone number categories are, including the trunk access code:
06: mobile telephone operators,
0800: free service numbers,
084, 085: used for VoIP
087: voicemail and virtual private numbers
088: large companies with more than one address
0970: machine to machine communication, numbers are 8 digits long
0979: machine to machine communication, numbers have no fixed length and are reserved for network internal usage
0900: paid information services
0906: adult lines
0909: entertainment

Toll-free numbers (0800) can always be dialled for free, even from (public) payphones; other numbers starting with 08 are not free.

Public resources
The emergency number is 112. GSM mobile phones may accept different numbers, such as 999, 000 or 911, depending on the firmware. Additionally, calls to 911 are forwarded to 112 (in the Caribbean Netherlands, this is reversed - 112 redirects to 911 in that case).

Directory assistance is available from several commercial providers, on 18xx (e.g., 1888 from KPN).

Caribbean Netherlands

The islands of Bonaire, Sint Eustatius and Saba, which form the Caribbean Netherlands after the dissolution of the Netherlands Antilles, retained the numbering plan of the Netherlands Antilles using country code +599, followed by 7, 3 or 4 for Bonaire, Sint Eustatius or Saba, respectively. Calls between the European Netherlands and Caribbean Netherlands are billed as international calls.

See also
 Communications in the Netherlands
 Telephone numbers in Aruba
 Telephone numbers in Sint Maarten (NANP)

References

External links
 The Ministry of Economic Affairs, Agriculture and Innovation is responsible for the Dutch Numbering plan.
 The Authority for Consumers & Markets  (ACM ) manages the available telephone and other numbers and assigns these to telecommunication companies, as well as being the regulatory body governing telecommunications providers in the Netherlands.
 De Telefoongids KPN telephone directory, combined white pages and yellow pages

Telecommunications in the Netherlands
Netherlands
Telephone numbers